Le Lude is a commune in the Sarthe department in the region of Pays de la Loire, northwestern France. On 1 January 2018, the former commune of Dissé-sous-le-Lude was merged into Le Lude.

See also
Communes of the Sarthe department

References

External links

 Website of Le Lude castle

Communes of Sarthe
Anjou